Pedro Campos may refer to:
 Pedro Campos (footballer, born 1995), Portuguese footballer
 Pedro Campos (footballer, born 2000), Chilean footballer
 Pedro Albizu Campos, Puerto Rican attorney and politician
 Pedro Campos Calvo-Sotelo, Spanish sailor